Sinseol-dong is a dong, legal neighbourhood of Dongdaemun-gu in Seoul, South Korea.

Attractions
 Seoul Folk Flea Market (re-opening on 26 April 2008) - it was featured in episode 39 of popular SBS program Running Man on 17 April 2011.

See also 
Administrative divisions of South Korea

References

External links
Dongdaemun-gu map

Neighbourhoods of Dongdaemun District